Charles Morley Wenyon  (1878–1948) was a distinguished English protozoologist.

Honours and prizes 
Wenyon was awarded many honours and prizes for his work during his lifetime including:
 The Makdougall-Brisbane Prize of the Royal Society of Edinburgh in 1927
 The Mary Kingsley Medal of the Liverpool School of Tropical Medicine in 1929 
 Officier de la Legion d'Honneur in 1933
 Elected Honorary Member of the Société Belge de Médecine Tropicale in 1934
 Honorary Life Member of the New York Academy of Sciences in 1945
 The Theobald Smith Gold Medal of the American Academy of Tropical Medicine in 1946
 Elected Honorary Fellow of the Royal Society of Medicine and Honorary Member of the Société de Pathologie Exotique in 1947
 Manson Medal of the Royal Society of Tropical Medicine and Hygiene

References

Fellows of the Royal Society
1878 births
1948 deaths
Manson medal winners
Presidents of the Royal Society of Tropical Medicine and Hygiene